Casigua El Cubo Airport  is an airport serving the city of Casigua-El Cubo in the Zulia state of Venezuela.

See also
Transport in Venezuela
List of airports in Venezuela

References

External links
OpenStreetMap - El Cubo
OurAirports - Casigua
HERE/Nokia - Casigua

Airports in Venezuela